Walter Joseph "Jay" Clayton III (born July 11, 1966) is an American attorney who served as the chairman of the U.S. Securities and Exchange Commission from May 4, 2017 until December 23, 2020. He was nominated for the position by President Donald Trump.

Early life and education 
Clayton was born at Fort Eustis in Newport News, Virginia. He grew up near Hershey, Pennsylvania, where his father worked for the local chocolate company, and Wallingford, Pennsylvania. Clayton graduated from Strath Haven High School in 1984. After attending Lafayette College, where he was a member of the soccer team, Clayton transferred to the University of Pennsylvania where he graduated with a Bachelor of Science in Engineering degree in 1988, and received the Thouron Award for post-graduate study in the United Kingdom. He received a Bachelor of Arts (promoted to a Master of Arts, per tradition) in economics from King's College, Cambridge in 1990. He then attended the University of Pennsylvania Law School where he graduated cum laude and Order of the Coif in 1993 with a Juris Doctor degree.

During college and graduate school, Clayton was a member of the Ocean City Beach Patrol and Penn Law rugby team, an intern with the U.S. Attorney's Office in Philadelphia and U.S. Representative Curt Weldon, and an employee of United Engineers and Constructors.

Career 
From 1993 to 1995, Clayton clerked for Judge Marvin Katz of the District Court for the Eastern District of Pennsylvania.

After being a summer associate at the firm in the summer of 1992, Clayton joined Sullivan & Cromwell full-time in October 1995 and became a partner in January 2001. At Sullivan & Cromwell, Clayton was a member of the firm's management committee and co-managing partner of the firm's General Practice Group. He specialized in mergers and acquisitions transactions and capital markets offerings and represented prominent Wall Street firms, including Goldman Sachs. He served as an adviser to numerous companies regarding issues related to the SEC, Federal Reserve, Department of Justice, and other agencies.

He has also helped multiple corporations raise money through initial public offerings, including Alibaba Group, Ally Financial, Och-Ziff Capital Management, Oaktree Capital Management, Blackhawk Network Holdings, and Moelis & Company. During the financial crisis of 2007–2008, Clayton advised Bear Stearns in its fire sale to JPMorgan Chase in 2007, Barclays Capital in the purchase of Lehman Brothers' assets following their bankruptcy, and Goldman Sachs in connection with the investment by Berkshire Hathaway.

Clayton disclosed to the U.S. Office of Government Ethics that his other corporate clients had included TeliaSonera AB, Ally Financial, Deutsche Bank, UBS, Volkswagen, SoftBank Group, The Weinstein Company, Pershing Square Capital Management, and Valeant Pharmaceuticals. Clayton's individual clients included Ocwen's former head William Erbey, Paul Tudor Jones, former Attorney General of Ireland Peter Southerland, CDW founder Michael Krasny and LinkedIn founder Reid Hoffman.

Clayton earned $7.6 million in 2016 from his firm and has a family wealth of at least $50 million. A substantial portion of his holdings were in mutual funds of the Vanguard Group. His investments also included private funds managed by Apollo Global Management, Bain Capital, J.C. Flowers & Co., and Richard C. Perry but he divested these investments upon confirmation.

SEC chair

Nomination and confirmation
On January 4, 2017, President-elect Donald Trump announced his intention to nominate Clayton to be SEC Chairman, and he was nominated on Inauguration Day, January 20, 2017. Clayton's nomination was endorsed by Manhattan District Attorney Cyrus Vance Jr. U.S. Senator Catherine Cortez Masto, a Democrat representing Nevada, expressed concern that Clayton represented Swedish firm TeliaSonera in a proposed venture that would combine Russian telecommunications companies MegaFon and Altimo. Clayton was not thought to have any ties to the Russian companies. On April 4, 2017, the Senate Banking Committee voted 15–8 to send Clayton's nomination to the full Senate, with three Democrats voting in favor of Clayton.

On May 2, 2017, the U.S. Senate voted 61–37 to confirm Clayton as Chairman of the SEC. Votes cast in favor of Clayton's confirmation included nine Democrats and one Independent alongside 51 Republican votes. On May 4, 2017, Clayton was sworn in, marking the official beginning of his role as Chairman.

Tenure
In connection with the nomination of Clayton in January, President Trump said in a statement that "[w]e need to undo many regulations which have stifled investment in American businesses, and restore oversight of the financial industry in a way that does not harm American workers." Upon Clayton's swearing-in, the SEC consisted of Clayton; Michael Piwowar, who was serving as acting Chairman; and Kara Stein. Subsequently, Hester Peirce and Robert J. Jackson Jr. joined the commission. In 2018, Piwowar and Stein stepped down, and Elad Roisman and Allison Lee joined the Commission in 2018 and 2019 respectively.

Clayton has expressed concern about the decline in the number of U.S. public companies and also has been outspoken on securities law issues related to distributed ledger technology, cryptocurrencies and initial coin offerings. Some predicted that he will look to encourage initial public offerings (IPOs) of companies and streamline the capital formation process by reducing the regulatory framework that applies to public companies in the United States.

Under Clayton's tenure as chairman of the SEC, the SEC charged the fewest number of insider trading cases since the Reagan administration.

In November 2020, Clayton stated his intention to resign at the end of the year, although his term would expire at the end of June 2021, Clayton resigned on December 23, 2020. One of his final actions and on his last day at the SEC before resigning was to sue Ripple Labs challenging the legality of trading cryptocurrency XRP as an unregistered security.

Southern District of New York 
On June 19, 2020, Attorney General Bill Barr announced that President Trump would nominate Clayton to replace Geoffrey Berman as United States attorney for the Southern District of New York.

Clayton was criticized for his role in the removal of Geoffrey Berman at a U.S. House hearing. Clayton said it was entirely his idea to become the U.S. Attorney for SDNY. He said he wanted the position because he had a "strong desire to continue in public service", and return to his New York-based family.

After SEC
In February 2021, Apollo Global Management appointed Clayton to the newly created role of lead independent director on its board. Clayton also rejoined Sullivan & Cromwell LLP, where he was a partner before entering government, to become senior policy adviser and counsel.

Professional memberships and activities 
Clayton is a member of the American Bar Association, served as an Adjunct Professor at University of Pennsylvania Law School beginning in 2009, and was Chairman of the New York City Bar Committee on International Business Transactions beginning in 2010. Prior to his confirmation, Clayton served on the Executive Committee of the Metropolitan Golf Association.

Personal life 
Clayton's wife Gretchen, whom he started dating while they attended the same Pennsylvania high school, worked at Goldman Sachs. At one point a small amount of her retirement assets (less than $1,001) was invested in an account managed by Omega Advisors. Clayton's wife resigned from her job prior to his confirmation.

References

External links

Alumni of King's College, Cambridge
American lawyers
Law clerks
Living people
Members of the U.S. Securities and Exchange Commission
Securities (finance)
University of Pennsylvania Law School alumni
Place of birth missing (living people)
Sullivan & Cromwell partners
1966 births
Finance law scholars
Scholars of securities law
University of Pennsylvania Law School faculty
Trump administration personnel